The Corps Guestphalia Hall is a fraternity affiliate of the Kösen Senior Convents Association (KSCV), where it is the oldest one.  The Guestphalia Halle corps has always stood for Fencing and Couleur (color).  Presently it once again located in Halle (Saale) and belongs to the Green Circle.  The Corps members are called Hallenser Westfalen.

History

The beginnings of the corps 
Guestphalia Halle was established on September 8, 1789 at University of Halle. Its motto is Neminem time, neminem laede!.

Associations of students from the Westphalian region of the Kingdom of Prussia in particular counties Mark and Ravensberg  already existed at the University of Halle at the beginning of the 18th century.  A Landsmannschaft of the "Westfälinger" was repealed and forbidden by royal edict of 22 November 1717.  However, tradition seems to have continued regardless.  In the second half of the 18th century, the old brotherhoods were increasingly displaced by the Masonic influenced student organizations.  From the Westphalian Landsmannschaft out so founded in the middle of 1777 the Order of Constantists.  In competition with the orders but also strengthened the compatriot teams or "Kränzchen", as they were also called in this time, once again.  Finally on September 8, 1789, the Westphalian country team was reconstituted with the Prussian colors black and white.

The purpose of this newly established  association was to protect the students from the restrictive orders of the authorities, to make them better acquainted and familiar with each other, to establish social virtues and genuine friendship, to ensure the freedom and honor of each individual and to provide support to distressed members (brothers).

Pubs and houses 

In 1810 a Westphalian pub in the "Cool Fountain" in Halle was first occupied by fraternity.  However, it is only from 1840 onwards that evidence of the good public pubs of Guestphalia can be found.  The reconstitution of the corps probably took place in the Gasthaus "Zur Schleuse" on Mansfelder Strasse, where the corps used to cook at that time.  Then the pub was until 1847 in the inn "Zur Stadt Berlin", 1847-1870 in the "Golden Harrow", interrupted only from 1857 to 1860 by a short phase in the inn "City of Cologne".  After the reconstitution of 1874, they first puckered in the restaurant "Für Fürstental" (until 1887, with a short break), then until 1888 in the "Marktschloß".

The first house actually own by fraternity was handed over to the assets on January 21, 1888 in Georgstraße 1.   It was built by the architect Otto Grote from Halle in 1910-1911 according to plans by the Leipzig architect Curt Einert (1863-1928), a new building in Burgstraße 40, which remained until the suspension in October 1935 Domicile of the Corps.

In Münster, Guestphalia first found a house in Königstraße, which later (until 2006) was replaced by the house Mozartstraße (later Nottebohmstraße) 5.  With the repurchase of the house Burgstraße 40 in Halle, the corps returned to his former home.

Notable members 
Christian Peter Wilhelm Beuth (1781–1853) was a Prussian statesman, involved in the Prussian reforms.
Rudolf Doehn (1821–1895) was a German writer and journalist. He participated in the American Civil War as volunteer in the Union Army.
Wolf von Engelhardt (1910–2008) was a Baltic German geologist and mineralogist.
Heinrich Fritsch (1844–1915) was a German gynecologist and obstetrician.
August von Haxthausen (1792–1866) was a German agricultural scientist, economist, lawyer, writer, and collector of folk songs.
Georg Friedrich Heilmann (1785–1862) was a Swiss military figure, politician and landscape painter.
Friedrich Kortüm (1788–1858) was a German historian.
August Albrecht Meckel (1790–1829) was a German physician.

References

Further reading 
 Oskar Kraft: Einweihung des neuen Korpshauses der Guestphalia-Halle. Academische Monatshefte 28 (1911/12), S. 338–340.
 Wilhelm Eckhardt: Historische Untersuchungen über den Bestand einer Guestphalia in Halle 1832–1840. Erlangen 1929
 200 Jahre Corps Guestphalia Halle zu Münster, hrsg. vom Westphalenverein e. V. Halle/Saale, Münster 1989.
 Thorsten Lehmann: Die Hallenser Corps im Deutschen Kaiserreich. Halle (Saale) 2007

Student societies in Germany
Guestphalia Halle, Corps
Organizations established in 1789
1789 establishments in the Holy Roman Empire